Oldřich Rulc (28 March 1911 – 4 April 1969) was a Czechoslovakian international football player.

Career
Rulc played club football for Sparta Prague and SK Židenice (currently FC Zbrojovka Brno). He also made 17 appearances and scored two goals for the Czechoslovakia national football team, including an appearance at the 1938 FIFA World Cup finals.

First League statistics

References 
  ČMFS entry

External links

Profile at fotbal.cz

1911 births
1969 deaths
Czech footballers
Czechoslovak footballers
1938 FIFA World Cup players
Czechoslovakia international footballers
AC Sparta Prague players
FC Zbrojovka Brno players
Association football forwards
Footballers from Prague